Relaxo Footwears Limited is an Indian multinational footwear manufacturer based in New Delhi. The company is the largest footwear manufacturer in India in terms of volume and second-largest in terms of revenue. The company makes products under 10 brands including Flite, Sparx, Bahamas and Schoolmate.

Among Bollywood actors signed up to endorse the company's brands are Salman Khan, Akshay Kumar, Katrina Kaif and Sonakshi Sinha.

See also
 Liberty Shoes

References

Companies based in New Delhi
Manufacturing companies based in Delhi
Shoe companies of India
Indian companies established in 1976
Indian brands
Indian footwear
Companies listed on the National Stock Exchange of India
Companies listed on the Bombay Stock Exchange
1976 establishments in Delhi